Arawe is an island in Papua New Guinea, located on the southern coast of New Britain about  from Cape Gloucester. It is also the name given to the island's surrounding area, which is also known as Cape Merkus. A small harbour known as Arawe Harbour provides an anchorage. The Battle of Arawe was fought for control of the region during World War II.

References 

West New Britain Province